Niabella pedocola is a Gram-negative, aerobic, rod-shaped, non-spore-forming and non-motile bacterium from the genus of Niabella which has been isolated from isolated from soil.

References

External links
Type strain of Niabella pedocola at BacDive -  the Bacterial Diversity Metadatabase

Chitinophagia
Bacteria described in 2016